Sherlock Holmes vs. Dracula or The Adventures of the Sanguinary Count) is a Sherlock Holmes pastiche novel by Loren D. Estleman, originally published in 1978.

The novel is an account of Holmes' adventure facing off against Bram Stoker's Dracula and is presented as a revision of the Stoker novel, albeit with Sherlock Holmes present in the narrative.

The book has since been republished by I-Books and Titan Books, the latter under their Further Adventures of Sherlock Holmes banner.

Reception
British Fantasy Society called the book "one of the better" Dracula/Holmes crossovers. Kirkus Reviews called it "an example of the more cautious and studied sort of pseudo-Sherlock...Not that the purist approach makes Estleman's academic, short-story-sized notion any more prepossessing."

Adaptations
Estleman's novel was adapted for BBC Radio in 1981. It has since been rebroadcast numerous times.

See also
Seance for a Vampire, a Holmes-Dracula crossover by Fred Saberhagen
 Anno Dracula

References

1978 American novels
American vampire novels
Dracula novels
Works based on Dracula
Sherlock Holmes novels
Sherlock Holmes pastiches
Crossover novels
Novels adapted into radio programs
Doubleday (publisher) books